Santo Anzà (born 17 November 1980 in Catania, Italy) is an Italian former professional road racing cyclist, who last rode for the UCI ProTeam .

Career achievements

Major results

2002
 4th GP Palio del Recioto
 5th Overall GP Kranj
2004
 9th Giro di Romagna
2005
 4th Overall Vuelta a Burgos
 4th Trofeo Melinda
 10th Giro di Lombardia
 10th Coppa Sabatini
2006
 1st Giro della Romagna
 3rd Gran Premio Fred Mengoni
 3rd Trofeo Melinda
 4th Giro dell'Emilia
 4th Giro dell'Appennino
 5th Coppa Agostoni
 6th Tre Valli Varesine
 7th Giro del Lazio
 7th GP Industria & Commercio di Prato
 8th Overall Brixia Tour
 8th GP Industria & Artigianato di Larciano
2007
 1st Trofeo Melinda
 2nd Overall Brixia Tour
 5th Giro del Lazio
 6th Coppa Placci
2008
 1st  Overall Brixia Tour
1st Stage 4
 5th Trofeo Melinda
 8th Tre Valli Varesine
 8th Giro dell'Appennino
2009
 3rd Overall Brixia Tour
1st Stage 4
 8th Trofeo Melinda

Grand Tour general classification results timeline

External links

1980 births
Living people
Italian male cyclists
Sportspeople from Catania
Cyclists from Sicily